This is a list of organizations opposing mainstream science by frequently challenging the facts and conclusions recognized by the mainstream scientific community. By claiming to employ the scientific method in order to advance certain fringe ideas and theories, they are often charged with promotion of various forms of pseudoscience.

List of organizations 
 American Federation of Astrologers
 Association for Neuro Linguistic Programming – a United Kingdom organization founded to promote neuro-linguistic programming.
 Astrological Association of Great Britain
 The Biodynamic Association – a United States-based company that promotes biodynamic agriculture systems.
 Center for Indoor Air Research – tobacco industry front group producing industry-friendly research on indoor air quality, disbanded as part of the Tobacco Master Settlement Agreement in 1998.
 Creation Research Society – promotes creation science since the 1950s.
 Discovery Institute – founded in 1990, promotes Intelligent Design.
 Edinburgh Phrenological Society – founded in 1820, the society was influential in its time, helping popularize the concept of phrenology in the 19th century. The last recorded meeting took place in 1870.
 Faculty of Astrological Studies
 Flat Earth Society –  an organization which aims to further the idea that the Earth is flat instead of an oblate spheroid. The modern organization was founded by Englishman Samuel Shenton in 1956 and was later led by Charles K. Johnson, who based the organization in his home in Lancaster, California. The formal society was inactive after Johnson's death in 2001 but was resurrected in 2004 by its new president Daniel Shenton.
 Global Energy Balance Network – funded by Coca-Cola and promoting the idea that obesity is due to lifestyle alone, and not excessive calorie consumption.
 The Heartland Institute – A think-tank on a variety of issues, including support of "climate change skepticism"
 Institute for Creation Research, promoting a religious worldview in contradiction to current knowledge of evolutionary biology.
 Kepler College, which grants certificates (and previously degrees) in the studies of astrology.
 Magi Society, an international association of astrologers.
 National Association for Research & Therapy of Homosexuality – an organization that offers conversion therapy and other treatments that purport to change the sexual orientation of individuals who experience unwanted same-sex attraction. The organization disagrees with the holding of the world's major mental health organizations that homosexuality is not a disorder.
 National Council for Geocosmic Research, which promotes research and education in astrology.
 National Institute for Discovery Science – the National Institute for Discovery Science (NIDSci) was a privately financed research organization based in Las Vegas, Nevada, USA, and operated from 1995 to 2004. It was founded in 1995 by real-estate developer Robert Bigelow, who set it up to research and advance serious study of various fringe science, and paranormal topics, most notably ufology. Deputy Administrator Colm Kelleher was quoted as saying the organization was not designed to study UFOs only. "We don't study aliens, we study anomalies. They're the same thing in a lot of people's minds, but not in our minds."
 Natural Philosophy Alliance, an organization which believes there are fundamental flaws in theories such as relativity, the big bang, and plate tectonics.
 New England Antiquities Research Association, which believes in the occupation of New England by ancient Celts and other western Europeans long before the arrival of the Pilgrims in Massachusetts.
 Noah's Ark Zoo Farm – a zoo near Bristol, UK, that incorporates its belief in Creationism in its educational material about animals.
 Parapsychological Association – founded in 1957, the organization's purpose was "to advance parapsychology as a science, to disseminate knowledge of the field, and to integrate the findings with those of other branches of science."
 Rosicrucian Fellowship, primarily a religious organization, but believing in unorthodox theories of the evolution of the planet Earth and life upon it.
 Thule Society, largely political, but also believed in Ultima Thule as a lost ancient landmass in the extreme north, home of the Aryan race.

Groups promoting quackery 
Quackery is the promotion of ineffective or fraudulent medical treatments.
 America's Frontline Doctors, a right wing group initially formed to oppose stay at home orders and promoting refuted treatments for COVID-19 including Hydroxychloroquine and Ivermectin. Since 2021, it has promoted a broad assortment of falsehoods about the Covid-19 pandemic and Covid-19 Vaccines.
 Association of American Physicians and Surgeons, right-wing group promoting AIDS denialism, refuted links between abortion and breast cancer, and other politically motivated pseudomedical theories.
 Australian Vaccination-Skeptics Network, anti-vaccination group.
 Generation Rescue, promoting the incorrect view that autism is caused by environmental factors.
 International Lyme and Associated Diseases Society, promoting the idea that chronic effects after Lyme disease (which are accepted) are caused by a lingering infection (which is not believed to be the cause).  See Lyme disease controversy.
 Morgellons Research Foundation, promoting a hypothetical new disease, morgellons, generally accepted as a manifestation of delusional parasitosis.
 National Center for Complementary and Integrative Health, originally the Office of Alternative Medicine and subsequently the National Center for Complementary and Alternative Medicine, established due to the work of Senator Tom Harkin with a brief to validate alternative medicine. A 2012 review found that $1.3bn had been disbursed in grants, and not one treatment had been validated as a result.

See also 
 List of topics characterized as pseudoscience
 :Category:Paranormal investigators

References

Fringe science
Pseudoscience
Science-related lists
Scientific skepticism
Pseudoscience-related lists